This is an alphabetically arranged list of trading posts or forts in present-day Montana from 1807 to the end of the fur trading era in the state.

History 
The North West Company fur trader Francois-Antoine Larocque travelled parts of the eastern present-day Montana in 1805, and the following explorations of the Lewis and Clark Expedition opened the area further for commerce. The first fur trading post built in the future state was Fort Raymond at the confluence of Yellowstone River and Bighorn River, where it carried out trade with the Crow Nation from 1807 to around 1813. Soon after the establishment of Fort Raymond, trail-blazers from the fur companies found way to the heart of the country of every Native Nation in the territory. Decade by decade, at number of smaller and bigger posts established by different trading companies from both Canada and the United States dotted the banks of the major rivers winding their way through the plains and mountain valleys. The biggest forts stayed active year after year, while others lasted a season and were destroyed by wind and weather or burned by Native Americans. Some of the ruins and old places of bargain are now recognized as historic sites by the United States or Montana.

List

Map

References

External links

History of Montana
Montana posts
Native American tribes in Montana
Montana-related lists